is a railway station in Satsumasendai, Kagoshima, Japan. It is operated by Kyushu Railway Company (JR Kyushu) and Hisatsu Orange Railway.

Lines 
Sendai Station is served by the Kyushu Shinkansen and Kagoshima Main Line, and also the Hisatsu Orange Railway Line. It was also the westernmost high-speed Shinkansen railway station in Japan, though this title was taken over by Nagasaki Station with the opening of the West Kyushu Shinkansen on 23 September 2022.

Platforms

Adjacent stations

History

1922 - Track from Sendai-Machi Station to Nishikata Station opens.
October 20, 1924 - Track from Sendai Station to Hiwaki Station is opened for as Miyanojo Line. 
October 1, 1940 - Sendai-machi Station was renamed Sendai Station.
January 10, 1987 - Miyanojo line is abolished (From Sendai Station to Satsuma-Ōkuchi Station).
March 13, 2004 - Kyushu Shinkansen services began.

Surrounding area
 Satsumasendai City Hall
 Sendai Post Office

References

External links

 

Stations of Hisatsu Orange Railway